Gathering is the ninth full-length studio album by American singer-songwriter Josh Ritter. It was released September 22, 2017 on Pytheas Recordings.

Critical reception

Rolling Stone described Gathering as a combination of country, gospel, and soul.

Brian D’Ambrosio of Huffington Post said Ritter was uncertain, brisk, and contemplative while remaining intimate to the listener.

Track listing
All songs written by Josh Ritter.

"Shaker Love Song (Leah)" – 1:03
"Showboat" – 4:22
"Friendamine" – 2:53
"Feels Like Lightning" – 3:02
"When Will I Be Changed" (featuring Bob Weir) – 5:52
"Train Go By" – 4:26
"Dreams" – 6:19
"Myrna Loy" – 7:30
"Interlude" – 1:24
"Cry Softly" – 2:45
"Oh Lord, Pt. 3" – 3:30
"Thunderbolt's Goodnight" – 4:05
"Strangers" – 3:28

Personnel

Musicians
 Josh Ritter – acoustic and electric guitar, lead and harmony vocals
 Zackariah Hickman – bass, acoustic guitar, Wurlitzer
 Sam Kassirer – piano, organ, synthesizers, percussion
 Josh Kaufman – guitar, synthesizer
 Ray Rizzo – drums, percussion
 Matt Douglas – saxophones, clarinets, flutes and horn arrangements
 Paul Rogers – trumpet

Production
 Recorded at Clubhouse Studio, Rhineback, NY; Compass Studio, Nashville, TN; The Shed, Raleigh, NC; and TRI Studios 
 Mixed by Chris Shaw and Trina Shoemaker
 Mastering by Jeff Lipton
 Cover Art by Josh Ritter

References

External links
Josh Ritter official website

Josh Ritter albums
2017 albums